Keith R. Laws is a professor of neuropsychology at the School of Psychology at the University of Hertfordshire.
Professor Laws' research centres on how cognitive functions and processes relate to brain structure and function; notably for research on cognitive functioning in people suffering from neurological and psychiatric disorders. Laws, with his colleagues, created one of the first research groups to investigate impairment of everyday knowledge in patients with schizophrenia and to demonstrate worse cognitive outcomes in women suffering from Alzheimer's disease. Laws' work on the link between MDMA (also known as ecstasy) drug use and poor memory is the principal analysis of its kind to date, and has been broadly cited in both national and international media. In 2013 he published a study showing that women are better at multitasking than men. Laws completed a PhD at the Department of Experimental Psychology, University of Cambridge. He is the author of over 100 papers and a recent book entitled 'Category-Specificity: Evidence for Modularity of Mind'. He is a Chartered Psychologist, Associate Fellow of the British Psychological Society (AFBPsS), Fellow of the Higher Education Academy (FHEA), a Fellow of the Royal Society of Arts (FRSA) and various academic organisations including the British Neuropsychological Society, British Neuropsychiatric Association, Experimental Psychology Society. and an editor at PLOS ONE.

Cognitive Behavioural Therapy for Psychosis (CBTp)
Laws has been a strong critic of the use of CBT for treating the psychotic symptoms associated with schizophrenia.

Music career

Laws was a former exponent of experimental music, and was a founding member of the post-punk band The The.

Laws is credited by fellow  founder Matt Johnson as being the originator of the band name. Laws answered an advertisement placed by Johnson in NME in 1978, seeking musicians to form a band.  as a duo, recorded the 7" 45rpm single for 4AD, "Controversial Subject"/"Black and White". Produced by Bruce Gilbert and Graham Lewis of Wire, Laws played synthesiser and sang, and Matt Johnson played guitar and also contributed vocals. The record sleeve mentions both Tom Johnston & Triash (Peter Ashworth) as having contributed, although the recordings featured only Laws and Johnson.

In early 1981,  also contributed the composition "Untitled" for The Some Bizzare Album. In September of that year, the duo of Johnson and Laws signed a deal with Some Bizzare Records, and released the 7" single "Cold Spell Ahead". Following final demo recordings for Phonogram - "Three Orange Kisses for Kazan", "Waiting for the Upturn" - Laws left to pursue his studies, leaving Johnson as a solo artist using a group moniker.

Bibliography

Books

Journal articles

References

External links
Department of Psychology, University of Hertfordshire Staff Directory
Keith Laws on Academia.edu

Living people
British psychologists
Fellows of the British Psychological Society
Alumni of the University of Cambridge
Neuropsychologists
1961 births
Academics of the University of Hertfordshire
Fellows of the Higher Education Academy